Kurigram District is a district of Bangladesh in the Rangpur Division. The district is located in northern Bangladesh along the country's border with India. Under Indian rule, the area was organized as a mahakuma and was not established as a district until 1984.

Etymology 
The name "Kurigram" is derived from the words Kuri and Gram. Kuri means "twenty" and Gram means "village" in Kol, a Munda language formerly spoken in the district.

History 
The region has historically been viewed as a part of Gaurabardhan (today Mahasthangarh) or Kamrup (today Assam). When the Kamrup kingdom was divided into many small kingdoms, the northern half of the Kurigram area was controlled by the new polity Cooch Behar, while the southern half became a part of the Uari kingdom.

At the beginning of the 12th century, the Khen dynasty emerged as a power in the area of Kurigram, led by such kings as Chakradhwaj and Nilambor. The capital of this new dynasty was located in Chatra, today found in the Ulipur upazila. In 1418, Hosen Shah, the Sultan of Gouro, attacked and defeated Nilambar. Nilambar was killed in battle and the area fell under the control of Muslims, eventually becoming a part of the Mughal Empire.

When the British regime took control over India, Hare Ram and Debi Sing, a broker of the East India Company, were placed in charge of the area as dewans (controllers). In 1770, the mismanagement of the East India Company caused the Great Bengal famine, leading to numerous rebellions led by native Kurigramis. At that time Kurigram was not one administrative unit, but was split up into the districts of Borobari, Ulipur, Chimari, and Nageshwari.

On 22 April 1875, the British government established the Kurigram mahakuma under the name "Kuriganj". It consisted of eight thanas called Kurigram, Lalmonirhat, Ulipur, Chilmari, Roumari, Nageshwar, Bhurungamari, and Pulbari. It as established as a district on 1 February 1984 and today consists of nine upazilas.

Geography
Kurigram District is located in the northern region of Bangladesh along the border with India. The district is bordered by Jamalpur district of Mymensingh division to the south, Gaibandha, Rangpur and Lalmonirhat districts as well as West Bengal state of India to the west, and the Indian states of Assam and Meghalaya to the east. In total, the district has 278.28 kilometers of international border with India. The district consists of 9 upazilas, 72 unions, and 1,872 villages.

The climate of the district is higher in the summer and lower in the winter compared to other parts of Bangladesh. The average maximum temperature is around 32–33 degrees Celsius and the average minimum temperature is around 5-10 degrees Celsius.

Several rivers flow through the center of Kurigram. The major rivers are the Brahmaputra (now called the Jamuna), Dharla, and Teesta. Minor rivers include the Dudhkumar, Phulkuar, Gangadhar, Jinjiram, and others. The three northern upazilas of the district were recently connected to the southern upazilas by a bridge over the Dharla river.

Demographics 

According to the 2011 Bangladesh census, Kurigram District had a population of 2,069,073, of which 1,010,442 were males and 1,058,831 females. Rural population was 1,742,779 (84.22%) while the urban population was 326,494 (15.78%). Kurigram district had a literacy rate of 42.52% for the population 7 years and above: 46.49% for males and 38.80% for females.

Religion

Muslims are the majority with 92.40% while Hindus are 6.55%. The Hindu population has fallen in percentage from 6.90% to 6.55% from 2001 to 2011.

Subdivision
Kurigram District is divided into nine upazilas (subdistricts):
 Bhurungamari Upazila: northernmost subdistrict, easily connected with the other two northern subdistricts. Shares a border with India.
 Char Rajibpur Upazila: island subdistrict in the south of Kurigram. Only accessible via water transport.
 Chilmari Upazila: subdistrict found on the banks of the central rivers. The subdistrict is an important port and economic hub.
 Kurigram Sadar Upazila: central subdistrict of Kurigram on the bank of the Dharla river. It is considered the main subdistrict of Kurigram.
 Nageshwari Upazila: northern subdistrict and largest by size.
 Phulbari Upazila: northern subdistrict on the border with India and the Bengali district of Lalmonhirhat.
 Rajarhat Upazila: western subdistrict which has developed as a business center.
 Raomari Upazila: independent subdistrict which played an important role in the Bangladeshi War for Independence.
 Ulipur Upazila

Places of interest
Potaka Bhaban
Shongram thaky Shadhinota Museum
North Bengal Museum
Dhorla Bridge
 Shahi Mosque
 Chandi Mandir
 Dolmancha Mandir
 Bir Protik Taramon Bibi's house
 Naodanga Royal Palace
 Sindur Moti
 Enclaves
 Pangeshwari Temple
 Bhetarbandh Royal Palace
 Chandamari Mosque
 Two Canons of Panga Kingdom (Preserved at the BGB Gate)
 Kazir Mosque Ulipur Kurigram
 Chilmari land port
 Ghogadaha Bazar
Munshibari

Infrastructure

Health 
In Kurigram, there is a single government hospital, two private hospitals, and an eye hospital. In addition, there are eight upazila-level health complexes, a maternity clinic, and a tuberculosis clinic in the district. The district has 100% Expanded Program on Immunization coverage, 96% sanitation coverage, and 96% pure drinking water coverage.

Education

Like in other parts of Bangladesh, there is a four level system for education. Students spend five years in Primary, five years in Secondary, two years in Higher Secondary, and four to nine years in Tertiary Education. There are 1 agricultural University, 43 colleges, 257 high schools, 563 registered and 552 non-registered primary schools, 224 madrasa, 1 polytechnical institute, and 1 technical school and college in the district. Along with Bengali, English is compulsory at all levels of education.
Kurigram Govt. College
Kurigram Govt. Women's college
Kurigram Agricultural University
Kurigram Collectorate School and College
Majida Adarsha Degree College
Khalilganj High School and College
Kurigram Govt. High school
Kurigram Govt. Girls' High School
Border Guard public School (BGPS), kurigram
Kurigram Nursing Institute
Kurigram Technical school & College
Shishu Niketan kurigram 
kisoloy primary school
Kurigram River View High school
Kurigram Alia Kamil Madrasah
Kurigram Farigat Madrasha (only for girls)

Notable people
 Taramon Bibi (freedom fighter)
 Syed Shamsul Haque (poet and writer)
 AKM Maidul Islam (politician)
 Kanai Lal Sarker (politician)

See also
Districts of Bangladesh

Notes

References

External links

Kurigram Web Portal
Ulipur.Com (উলিপুর ডট কম)
UlipurUpazila.Com (উলিপুর উপজেলা ডট কম)

 
Districts of Bangladesh